Apricena is an Apulian town in the province of Foggia.

This territory is mainly plain, cultivated with olives, cereals and wine. The economy is focused on quarrying the local rock, the Stone of Apricena,  and exporting it to Germany, Japan, and China.

History
Apricena developed from the summer residence of the Emperor Frederick II.

Main sights
Baronial Palace (Palazzo baroniale, commonly known as Torriolo)
The clocktower (Torre dell'orologio)
Mother Church of St. Martin and Lucy
The abandoned Monastery of San Giovanni in Piano, where Pope Celestine V fled after renouncing his papacy.
The ruins of Frederick II's castle, at Castelpagano.

Twin towns
 Altavilla Vicentina, Italy

References

Cities and towns in Apulia
Castles in Italy